Hojai is a town and a municipal board in Nagaon district in the Indian state of Assam. It is located on the banks of the two tributaries of Brahmaputra namely Kapili and Jamuna

Etymology
The term Hojai means Priest in Dimasa language and is also one clan of Dimasa people, who  populated the settlement during its initial formation.

Geography
It has an average elevation of 59 metres (193 feet).

History
Hojai was a part of the Dimasa Kachari Kingdom in medieval times. The Dimasa Kacharies living in Hojai is known as "Hojai-Kacharies" to others. "Hojai" is one of the clans (Sengphongs) of the Dimasa tribe, probably The city "Hojai" got its name from this clan. It was made a sub-division on 15 August 1983 under Nagaon district. On 15 August 2015, it was declared a new district of the state along with 3 other new districts. On 31st December 2022, the district were remerged with their previous district.

Demographics 
As of 2011 Indian Census, Hojai had a total population of 36,638, of which 18,762 were males and 17,876 were females. Population within the age group of 0 to 6 years was 3,869. The total number of literates in Hojai was 29,708, which constituted 81.1% of the population with male literacy of 83.9% and female literacy of 78.1%. The effective literacy rate of 7+ population of Hojai was 90.7%, of which male literacy rate was 93.8% and female literacy rate was 87.4%. The Scheduled Castes and Scheduled Tribes population was 3,158 and 197, respectively. Hojai had 7049 households in 2011.

Language

69.6% of the people speak  Bengali, followed by Hindi, 16.0%; Assamese, 10.7%; and Meitei, 1.6% speakers.

Religion

Most of the population follow Hinduism (81.11%), with Islam being the largest minority religion with 18.28% adherents. Sikhism, Christianity and other religions are followed by less than one per cent of the population.

Administration
Administrative duties are carried on from Sankardev Nagar in NH-27 where the DC Office, Judicial Courts as well District SP Offices are located. The DC Office campus also houses the Government Circuit House within it. Hojai Judicial Courts are situated at Sankardev Nagar approximately 8 km away from Hojai Town near NH-27. Advocates of the Hojai Judicial Courts have their own Association known as "Hojai Bar Association", established in 1982.

District administration
The present Deputy Commissioner is Shri Anupam Choudhury, ACS and the present Superintendent of Police is Sri Barun Purkayastha. and present Additional Superintendent of police is Punjit Duwara, APS. Deputy Superintendent of Police Hojai is Rosy Talukdar, APS.

District judiciary
Initially the Judicial Court at Hojai was established on 20 October 1982 and functioned as Court of Judicial Magistrate First Class. In due course of time, later on, the Courts of Additional District and Sessions Judge (Fast Track Court), Sub-Divisional Judicial Magistrate, Munsiff cum JMFC Courts were established and functioning under District Judiciary, Nagaon.

On 6 March 2021, Hon'ble Mr. Justice Suman Shyam,Judge Guahati High Court has inaugurated the newly created Courts of District & Sessions Judge and Chief Judicial Magistrate at Hojai, Sankardev Nagar. On inauguration of the new District Judiciary, Sri Aditya Hazarika became the first District & Sessions Judge and Sri Shakti Sharma became the first Chief Judicial Magistrate of Hojai District.

Politics

Hojai is an MLA constituency. It falls under Nagaon LS constituency. It was part of Jamunamukh LAC. Since its inception in 1967, seven people were elected as MLAs. The first was Jonab Rahimuddin Ahmed. He was followed by Idris Ali Fakir, Sadhan Ranjan Sarkar, Santi Ranjan Dasgupta and since 1991, Ardhendu Kumar Dey has been consistently elected as an MLA, the lone defeat coming in 2006 to AIUDF's Aditya Langthasa who served as an MLA for a single term. Ardhendu Kumar Dey regained his seat in 2011 for a fourth term. For the first time, in 2016 assembly elections, BJP wrested this seat with the incumbent MLA being Shiladitya Dev.As of 2021, Ramkrishna Ghosh is elected in Assam Legislative Assembly election in 2021 from Hojai constituency.At present, Ramkrishna Ghosh is the MLA of Hojai District.
MLA of 90 No Jamunamukh Constituency is Mohammed Sirajuddin Ajmal. MLA of Lumding Constituency is Sibu Mishra.

Economy
Hojai is one of the important hubs of agarwood oil extraction and trade. In 2019, the Assam government under Sarbananda Sonowal allowed plantation of agarwood in five hectares.

Education

List of Educational institutes in Hojai
Abdul Hasib HS School
Ajmal College of Arts & Science
Deshabandhu Bidyapith HS High School, Hojai
Don Bosco High School, Hojai
East Point English High School
Markaz Academy
Rabindranath Tagore University, Hojai
Sankardev Jr. College.                              
Skylark English Academy
Zenith English Higher Secondary School

Healthcare

Hospitals 
Hojai has two hospitals. Hojai Civil Hospital is an Assam Government hospital and Haji Abdul Majid Memorial Hospital (HAMM) and Research Center is a 200-bed private Hospital, inaugurated in 1995 by Mother Teresa. It offers free treatment to the poor. Its charitable dispensary, established in 1986, treats over ten patients for free every day. The hospital has an Operating Theatre and a Dental clinic.

Transport

Road

State roads connect Hojai to the rest of the state. The nearest National Highway is NH54. Buses connect Hojai to the rest of Assam and other states. There is a proposed flyover in Hojai. Flyover work is in progress.

Railway

The Hojai railway station lies on the Guwahati–Lumding section line of the Lumding railway division. The station provides railway connectivity to different cities of India through many long-distance trains. Almost all of the major trains have a stoppage including the Rajdhani Express which connects the national capital.

Airport
The nearest airport is Tezpur Airport, about 120 km away.

The nearest International Airport is LGB International Airport in Guwahati, about 190 km away.

See also 
 Hojai Vidhan Sabha
 Shanti Bon

References

External links
Hojai official website

Cities and towns in Hojai district